William Stuart Scott "Stu" Freebairn  (born 12 January 1932) is a former All Blacks rugby union player from New Zealand.  He was a Wing threequarter.

He played 14 matches for the All Blacks in their 1953-54 tour (27 points and 9 tries). 
  
He played for Manawatu, and for the Feilding club. He was born in New Plymouth.

He competed in long jump and relay events in national athletics championships.

References

Bibliography
Palenski, R., Chester, R., and McMillan, N., (2005). The Encyclopaedia of New Zealand Rugby (4th ed.).  Auckland: Hodder Moa Beckett. 

1932 births
Living people
New Zealand rugby union players
New Zealand international rugby union players
Rugby union wings
Manawatu rugby union players
Rugby union players from New Plymouth